The Alerus Center is an indoor arena and convention center in the north central United States, located in Grand Forks, North Dakota. The facility is owned and operated by the city of Grand Forks and opened  on February 10, 2001.

The arena's major tenant is the University of North Dakota football team, and also hosts many large concerts, sporting events, and trade shows. The seating capacity for football is 12,283, and up to 21,000 for other events. Located southwest of the UND campus, it is just east of Interstate 29 and south of its exit 140, the junction with state highway 297.

The convention center section of the facility includes a  ballroom and twelve meeting rooms. The convention center is used for conferences, seminars, banquets, parties, and smaller concerts. Directly adjacent to the Alerus Center is a large hotel and waterpark complex called the Canad Inns Destination Center. 

Alerus Center is named after a local financial institution, Alerus Financial, which purchased the building's naming rights. Prior to opening, the facility had been referred to as the Aurora Events Center.

History
After attempts going back to 1984 to fund expansion of the downtown civic center or construction of a new convention center (1992), in 1995 a vote to increase the local sales tax to build a new events center (dubbed The Aurora Events Center, costing $43 to $49 million) passed with 60% approval.  Cost overruns required another vote in 1996 on an events center to cost $57 million which passed with 51% approval.

The Flood of 1997 delayed the project and led to redesigns to make the facility less susceptible to future flooding. Compass Management was hired to manage facility and in 2000 Aurora was renamed Alerus Center after Alerus Financial bought naming rights for twenty years. Alerus Center opened on February 10, 2001 with a final cost of $80 million. In 2006 construction started on Canad Inns hotel tower and water park, and was completed in 2007.

In 2007, the city ended its management contract with Compass Management but the same year rehired Compass Management, now renamed VenuWorks, with the provision they won't be paid if they lose taxpayer money. In 2009  Alerus Commission announced they lost $720,000 in the events fund due to Alerus operations.  No accounting of that loss is made available to the public.

In July 2017, Spectra came in to take over the management contract for the Alerus Center.

Notable events

Concerts

Other events
Other events have also been held at Alerus Center including WWE Smackdown, Toughest Monster Truck Tour, and the 2008 North Dakota Democratic-NPL Convention featuring presidential candidates Barack Obama and Hillary Clinton speaking.

Competition
Grand Forks is unique because it is a relatively small market with two major event centers, Alerus Center and the Ralph Engelstad Arena, both of which often bid to host the same events. To a lesser extent, the Chester Fritz Auditorium in Grand Forks also sometimes competes for these same events as well. Regionally, the Fargodome in nearby Fargo and the Canada Life Centre in Winnipeg, Manitoba are seen as competitors to Alerus Center.

Canad Inns Destination Center
Located directly north of Alerus Center sits the Canad Inns Destination Center, completed in 2007. The Destination Center also includes the largest waterpark in the state, three restaurants, a "boutique" casino, and an arcade. This was the first facility in the United States for the Canadian hotel chain.

See also
 List of NCAA Division I FCS football stadiums

References

External links
Official site
Alerus Center - North Dakota Athletics

College football venues
Covered stadiums in the United States
Buildings and structures in Grand Forks, North Dakota
Tourist attractions in Grand Forks, North Dakota
American football venues in North Dakota
Convention centers in North Dakota
North Dakota Fighting Hawks football
Indoor arenas in North Dakota
2001 establishments in North Dakota
Sports venues completed in 2001